The Litchfield Law School of Litchfield, Connecticut, was the first independent law school established in America for reading law. Founded and led by lawyer Tapping Reeve, the proprietary school was unaffiliated with any college or university. While Litchfield was independent, a long-term debate resulted in the 1966 recognition of William & Mary Law School as the first law school to have been affiliated with a university.

Reeve began teaching his first student in 1774 and was teaching by lecture by 1784. Reeve later became the Chief Justice of the Connecticut Supreme Court. The school closed in 1833, having educated over 1,100 students, including Aaron Burr and John C. Calhoun. The law school, including Reeve's house, was declared a National Historic Landmark, in 1965, as the Tapping Reeve House and Law School, which is owned and operated by the Litchfield Historical Society as a museum displaying life in a 19th-century period school. The Society also operates the Litchfield History Museum.

Tapping Reeve
Reeve was born on Long Island, New York, in 1744. He graduated from the College of New Jersey (now Princeton University) in 1763, serving for seven years as a tutor at the Grammar School that was connected with the college. There he met the children of Aaron Burr Sr.—Aaron Burr (later Vice President of the United States) and Sally Burr, who were both his students.

Tapping Reeve moved to Connecticut and studied law under Judge Jesse Root of Hartford, and was admitted to the bar in 1772. In the same year, he married Sally Burr. They then moved to Litchfield and Reeve started his own law practice. Tapping Reeve built his six-room Litchfield house in 1773 and settled in with his wife. In 1780 he added a downstairs wing for Sally, who found it difficult to climb stairs.

Law School

In addition to practicing law, Reeve trained many prospective attorneys, including Aaron Burr, his brother in law.  Students lived in the homes of town residents and traveled to Reeve's house on South Street to receive their morning lectures on the common law in Reeve's downstairs parlor.  In 1784, in response to increasing demand, Reeve had a one-room school built adjacent to his house. James Gould became Reeve's associate when Reeve was elected to the Connecticut Supreme Court in 1798. Reeve withdrew in 1820 and Gould continued until 1833.  The school's lectures covered the entire body of the law including real estate, rights of persons, rights of things, contracts, torts, evidence, pleading, crimes, and equity.

Notable alumni

The list of students who attended Tapping Reeve's law school includes two Vice Presidents of the United States (Aaron Burr and John C. Calhoun), 101 members of the United States House of Representatives, 28 United States senators, six United States cabinet secretaries, three justices of the United States Supreme Court, 14 state governors and 13 state supreme court chief justices.  Litchfield Law School students also held state and local political office and became business leaders. Students went on to found university law schools and become university presidents.  Framed pictures of students are still hung in the school, including George Catlin, Horace Mann (the educator), Aaron Burr, Oliver Wolcott Jr., and Roger Sherman Baldwin.  Each name is followed by the year that the student finished, when known.

See also
List of National Historic Landmarks in Connecticut
National Register of Historic Places listings in Litchfield County, Connecticut
Tapping Reeve

References

Bibliography 
Baldwin, Simeon Eben.  James Gould: A Sketch. Philadelphia: John C. Winston Co., 1909.
Beecher, Lyman.  A Sermon Preached at the Funeral of the Hon. Tapping Reeve: Late Chief Justice of the State of Connecticut, who Died December Thirteen, Eighteen Hundred and Twenty-Three, in the Eightieth Year of His Age, with Explanatory Notes. Litchfield, CT:  S.S. Smith, 1827.
Blondel-Libardi, Catherine, "Rediscovering the Litchfield Law School Notebooks," Connecticut History 46 (Spring 2007): 70–82.
Calder, Jacqueline. 1978.  Life and Times of Tapping Reeve and his Law School. Typescript.
Collier, Christopher. "Tapping Reeve, The Connecticut Common Law, and America's First Law School." Connecticut Supreme Court History 1 (2006): 13–25.
Farnham, Thomas J. "Tapping Reeve and America's First Law School."  New England Galaxy 17 (1975): 3–13.
Fisher, Samuel H. The Litchfield Law School: Address by Samuel Fisher. Litchfield, CT: Litchfield Enquirer Press, 1930.
Fisher, Samuel H. Litchfield Law School, 1774-1833: A Biographical Catalogue of Students. New Haven, CT: Yale University Press, 1946.
Halow, D. Brooke. Litchfield's Legacy in Law: A Study of the Litchfield Law School's Influence on Legal Training in America, 1784-1833.  American Studies 493, Yale Law School, 1996.
Kilbourn, Dwight C. The Bench and Bar of Litchfield County, Connecticut, 1709-1909: Biographical Sketches of Members, History and Catalogue of the Litchfield Law School, Historical Notes. Litchfield, CT: Self Published, 1909.
Kronman, Anthony, ed. History of the Yale Law School.  New Haven, CT: Yale University Press, 2004.
Litchfield Historical Society.  The Litchfield Law School, Litchfield, Connecticut: A Brief Historical Sketch. Litchfield, CT: Litchfield Historical Society, 1952.
Litchfield Historical Society.  Presentation of the Reeve Law School building to the Litchfield Historical Society at Litchfield, Conn., August 22d, 1911.  Litchfield, CT: Litchfield Enquirer Press, 1911.
Litchfield Historical Society.  The Noblest Study: The Legacy of America's First School of Law. Permanent Exhibition, Tapping Reeve House, Litchfield, CT.
Litchfield Law School. Catalogue: Reprint of 1900. Litchfield, CT: Litchfield Enquirer Press, 1900.
Litchfield Law School Students. Catalogue of the Litchfield Law School From 1798 to 1827 Inclusive. Litchfield, CT: S.S. Smith, 1828.
McKenna, Marian C. Tapping Reeve and the Litchfield Law School.  New York: Oceana, 1986.
Pruitt, Jr., Paul M. and David I. Durham. Commonplace Books of Law: A Selection of Law Related Notebooks from the Seventeenth Century to the Mid-Twentieth Century. Tuscaloosa, AL: University of Alabama Law Library, 2005.
Sheppard, Steve, ed.. The History of Legal Education in the United States. 2vols. Pasadena, CA: Salem Press, Inc., 1999.

Further reading
 Boonshoft, Mark.  "The Litchfield Network: Education, Social Capital, and the Rise and Fall of a Political Dynasty, 1784–1833." Journal of the Early Republic 34.4 (2014): 561–595. Online</ref>
Hicks, Paul DeForest, "The Litchfield Law School: Giding the New Nation," Prospecta Press (2019)
Hicks, Paul DeForest, "Litchfield Law School Alumni on the New York Courts," Judicial Notice, 16, (2021) 4-11

External links
Reeve House and Litchfield Law School - Litchfield Historical Society
Helga J. Ingraham Memorial Library Finding Aids - Archon - Litchfield Historical Society
 The Ledger - Litchfield Historical Society

 
1773 establishments in Connecticut
1833 disestablishments in the United States
Education in Litchfield County, Connecticut
Litchfield, Connecticut
National Historic Landmarks in Connecticut
Museums in Litchfield County, Connecticut
Historic house museums in Connecticut
Education museums in the United States
Law schools in Connecticut
One-room schoolhouses in Connecticut
Buildings and structures in Litchfield County, Connecticut
Houses on the National Register of Historic Places in Connecticut
Historic American Buildings Survey in Connecticut
Independent law schools in the United States
Historical society museums in Connecticut
Educational institutions established in 1773
National Register of Historic Places in Litchfield County, Connecticut
Houses in Litchfield County, Connecticut
Defunct private universities and colleges in Connecticut
University and college buildings on the National Register of Historic Places in Connecticut
Defunct law schools